Stella Inquisitorus ("Star Inquisitor") is a science fiction "space opera" sequel to the French supernatural role-playing game In Nomine Satanis / Magna Veritas. It was written by Croc and published in 1993 by Siroz. 

Characters play Angels, Demons, or pagan Space Vikings. Stella Inquisitorus uses, and is compatible with, the Second Edition of the In Nomine Satanis / Magna Veritas rules.

Plot overview
The plot is set in 6993 AD. At the dawn of the 21st century, God and Lucifer ended the Great Game and revealed their existence. This triggered Armageddon. Both factions began fighting openly, demanding that humans choose their side or die. A faction of pagan humans, the Vikings, rejected both sides and sought a glorious death in heroic combat. Earth became a radioactive wasteland after the Catholic Fleet bombarded it from orbit to defeat the Antichrist.    

Later, faster-than-light travel by passing through Paradise or Hell was discovered, opening up space to colonization. Technology is banned or controlled.   

God formed the militantly Catholic Stella Vaticanum ("Star Vatican"), an empire that covers half of existing space. The masses under His protection are ruthlessly monitored by the Inquisition. Any sign of heresy or Demonic corruption in a subject planet's population is punishable by genocide. The other half is controlled by the satanic Dunkle Reik ("Dark Empire"). Each subjugated planet is ruled by a Demon Lord viceroy who has moulded it to fit the incarnation of their Demon Prince's Word. The Demons harvest their subjects' souls to power their weapons and starships.

Accessories
Gamemaster's Screen [1993]: A four-panel gamemaster's screen. It comes with a 16-page booklet containing a beginning scenario. It also includes stats for 6 Angelic starships, 6 Demonic starships, and 6 Viking starships. 
Stella Incognita [1993]: The space travel and space exploration sourcebook. Details the Stellae Incognitae ("Hidden Stars" - lost solar systems forgotten by both the Stella Vaticanum and Dunkle Reik) and the Independent Federations (isolated planets within Stella Vaticanum space). Includes a chapter on astronomy and rules for world creation.  
Strychnine IV [1993]: Details an entire solar system of four planets. There are five scenarios (2 Angelic, 2 Demonic and one that could be used for either - or both - sides). The first four concern each planet: the hotly contested farm planet of Haven I (now a sea of radioactive glass), the hostile jungle world of Virus II (where technology mysteriously malfunctions and the plant life is the apex predator), the fortified ice world of Cryo III (held by a fanatic Viking army against all comers) and the polluted industrial warzone world of Strychnine IV (where the seas are pure corrosive poison). The fifth scenario concerns a battle inside the besieged hulk of the Hellraiser - a powerful Dunkle Reik space battleship that would disrupt the balance of power should it escape.

References

French role-playing games
Horror role-playing games
Role-playing games introduced in 1993
Science fantasy role-playing games
Space opera role-playing games